Katahu is a village in the Nicobar district of Andaman and Nicobar Islands, India. It is located in the Great Nicobar tehsil.

Demographics 

According to the 2011 census of India, Katahu has only 1 household. The effective literacy rate (i.e. the literacy rate of population excluding children aged 6 and below) is 0%.

References 

Villages in Great Nicobar tehsil